Grevillea rhizomatosa, commonly known as Gibraltar grevillea, is a species of flowering plant in the family Proteaceae and is endemic to a restricted area of north-eastern New South Wales. It is a spreading, bushy shrub with egg-shaped to almost round leaves and small clusters of green and pinkish-red flowers.

Description
The upper surface of the leaves is concave and the lower surface is densely hairy. Flowering mainly occurs from September to December but the plant is not known to set fruit or seed.

Taxonomy
Grevillea rhizomatosa was first formally described in 1994 by Peter Olde and Neil Marriott in the journal Telopea from specimens collected by Olde in the Gibraltar Range National Park in 1992. The specific epithet (rhizomatosa) means "bearing a rhizome", referring to the species' root-suckering habit.

Distribution and habitat
Gibraltar grevillea grows in densely shrubby forest on sandy soil, usually near creeks, and is endemic to the Gibraltar Range National Park.

Conservation status
Grevillea rhizomatosa is listed as "vulnerable" under the Australian Government Environment Protection and Biodiversity Conservation Act 1999 and the New South Wales Government Biodiversity Conservation Act 2016. The threats to the species include its small population size, inappropriate fire regimes, trampling by people, and track maintenance.

References

rhizomatosa
Proteales of Australia
Flora of New South Wales
Plants described in 1994